The Essaqwand Rock Tombs are three rock-hewn tombs located 25 km southwest of Harsin in Kermanshah Province, Iran. On top of the middle tomb there is a rock relief of a man with his profile toward the viewers. He is holding his hands in prayers in front of him. There is also a torch and a fire altar in front of him. Behind the fire altar there is another man, holding up something in his hands. The tombs have been attributed to different historical eras including Medes, Achaemenids, Seleucids and Parthians.

See also
Sorkh Deh chamber tomb
Dekhmeh Rawansar

References

 Kermanshah CHHTO website

Archaeological sites in Iran
Buildings and structures in Kermanshah Province
Sculpture of the Ancient Near East
Medes
Rock-cut tombs
Burial sites of the Achaemenid dynasty
Archaeology of the Achaemenid Empire
Rock reliefs in Iran